The Alsco Uniforms 300 is an annual 300-mile (482.803 km) NASCAR Xfinity Series race held at the Charlotte Motor Speedway in Concord, North Carolina during Memorial Day weekend as a support race for the Coca-Cola 600.

The race's origins trace back to 1978, when a it was a NASCAR Late Model Sportsman Series race was held the day before the World 600. In 1982 it became a Busch Series race. The race celebrated its 40th running in 2018, and is considered one of the more popular races on the Xfinity Series schedule.

From its inception through 2004, the race was scheduled for Saturday afternoon. In 1985 only, it was held the same day as The Winston. Lights were installed at Charlotte in 1993, and from 2005 to 2009 the race was a Saturday night race. In 2010, the race was moved back to 2:30 p.m. eastern in response to fans wanting an afternoon race and allowing for ABC coverage. In 2015, the race's broadcast was transferred to Fox NASCAR after the departure of the NASCAR on ESPN content, allowing both of the races in Charlotte (the 300 on Saturday, and the 600 on Sunday) to air on Fox.

In 2018, Alsco, a linen and uniform rental services company, became the entitlement sponsor for the race, dubbing it the Alsco 300. The name was tweaked in 2021 to become the Alsco Uniforms 300.

Past winners

2008, 2010, 2016, 2018, and 2020: Race extended due to an overtime finish.
2009: Race shortened due to rain.
2020: Race postponed from May 23 to May 25 due to the COVID-19 pandemic.

Multiple winners (drivers)

Multiple winners (teams)

Manufacturer wins

References

External links

1982 establishments in North Carolina
NASCAR Xfinity Series races
 
Recurring sporting events established in 1982
Annual sporting events in the United States